Glazanikha is a rural locality (a settlement) in Kodinskoye Rural Settlement of Onezhsky District, Arkhangelsk Oblast, Russia. The population was 415 as of 2010. There are 12 streets.

Geography 
It is located on the Shomboruchey River, 57 km southeast of Onega (the district's administrative centre) by road. Vonguda is the nearest rural locality.

References 

Rural localities in Onezhsky District